Johannes Rossouw (born 2 December 1964) is a South African wrestler. He competed in the men's freestyle 100 kg at the 1992 Summer Olympics.

References

External links
 

1964 births
Living people
South African male sport wrestlers
Olympic wrestlers of South Africa
Wrestlers at the 1992 Summer Olympics
Place of birth missing (living people)